Nath – Zewar Ya Zanjeer is an Indian television series that airs on Dangal TV. It stars Chahat Pandey, Arjit Taneja, Avinash Mishra, and Abhishek Tewari. The show premiered on 23 August 2021 at 10:00 PM IST replacing Prem Bandhan, however, it was shifted to 08:00 PM IST due to lower Television Rating Points (TRP).

Plot 
Mahua an Innocent bright girl in studies who lives with his father and her mother in a village, She had an elder sister named Boondi. At another side, Shambhu Thakur who is the son of Avataar and Janki and a family member of the Wealthy women named Durga Thakur Aka Ammaji and he had an elder brother named Ramesh Thakur and also had a younger brother named Radhe Thakur. She meets Shambhu accidentally when he drives the jeep and accidentally pours the muddy water in Mahua's dress they also have an argument and they hate together. When Mahua was at the age of 18 the poor family sells her to Ramesh using the 'Nath Utrayi' system in village. He tries to kill Mahua at Multiple times but it was stopped by Shambhu and he saves her. But, another side Boondi's marriage is fixed with Shambhu. Boondi agrees to their marriage, At the event of the marriage Padma Thakur, who is the wife of Ramesh Thakur and her teams replaced Boondi and Brings Mahua as his bride and later he marries Mahua thinking that he is married to Boondi. But when Shambhu shocks to see he is married to Mahua not Boondi so he started to hate her.

Mahua gains pregnant and birth two daughters. when Aryan's father takes one baby and escapes from the Labour Room. Mahua gets happy to see her child but unknown to her she had another daughter too. Mahua sees a woman selling a child to some people and they try to abandon the child. She sees this and takes the child from those people, unaware to Mahua the child is none other than her daughter. But the same woman comes inside the house by saying her baby is missing. Aryan doubts at Mahua and he sees another baby in the hand of Mahua thinking that she had another affair. Aryan lashes at Mahua which causes her to separate. Mahua takes her daughter and raises her and Aryan takes her daughter and raises her on his own.

5 Years Later, Mahua is now living in an ordinary lifestyle at the village and also a school teacher and also she raising her daughter Krishna. While other side Aryan is now married to women named Kajol and raising her daughter Gauri. Gauri and Krishna grown up and studies in a same school. Mahua meets Gauri at a market but unaware to her that Gauri is her daughter. While Aryan meets and saves Krishna from the goons but unaware to him that Krishna is also his daughter. And they two befriends with them unaware of their identities. Kajol creates many problems inside the family and she uses her evil games to get her love to Aryan. Aryan Doesn't loves her and he only loves Mahua. Gauri decides to meet her real mother. But unaware to Gauri that Mahua is her real mother and also Krishna decides to meet her father but she also unawares to her that Aryan is her father.

Aryan decided to divorce Mahua so that he can marry Kajol and live happily. Mahua refuses to sign the divorce papers and a mad Ammaji announces Aryan and Kajol's wedding in front of the villagers which causes Kajol happy to knows this and Aryan agrees to his wedding and a heartbroken Mahua agrees to their wedding too. However, her paternal aunt camed and she announces to them that she   fixed Mahua's marriage to her one of her relative named Rajbir and also the preparation of the wedding will be at this house. The Thakur Family agrees and they engaged to both of their fiance's and then Radha Thakur, who is Radhe's wife comes to knows that Krishna is non-another Mahua and Aryan's daughter and also she is Gauri's sister.

Cast

Main 
 Chahat Pandey as Mahua Shambhu Thakur/Mahua Aryan Mishra: Shambhu and Aryan's widow, Gouri and Krishna's mother (2021-present)
 Abhishek Tewari as Shoaib (2023–present)

Recurring 
Avinash Mishra as Aryan Mishra: Mahua husband, Gauri and Krishna's father (2022–2023)/Viren Mishra : Doppelganger of Aryan and Mahua's obsessive lover (2022)(Dead)
 Arjit Taneja as Shambhu Singh Thakur: Mahua's first husband who is killed by Boondi and Ramesh  (2021–2022) (Dead)               
 Anurag Sharma as Ramesh Singh Thakur : Avtaar's brother, Adhiraj and Shambhu's uncle and killer, Radhe's father and Padma's husband (2021–present)
 Pratima Kazmi as Durga Singh Thakur aka Ammaji : Matriarch of Thakur Family and Mahua's mother figure, Gouri and Krishna's grandmother figure, Ramesh and Avtaar's mother (2021–present)
 Anjana Singh as Padma Singh Thakur : Ramesh Thakur's wife and Radhe's mother (2021–present)
 Ravi Gossain as Avtaar Singh Thakur ; Janki's husband, Adhiraaj and Shambhu's father (2021–2022)
 Pyumori Mehta Ghosh as Janki Singh Thakur: Avtaar's wife, Shambhu and Adhiraj's adopted mother and Mahua's former mother-in-law (2021–2022)
 Vaibhavi Kapoor as Boondi: Mahua's sister and Shambhu's obsessive lover, Radhe's ex-wife, evil spirit (2021–2022)(dead)
 Ankur Dwivedi as Bablu: Mahua and Boondi's brother (2021–2022)
 Akanksha Gilani as Mahua's aunt (2021–present)
 Riya Bhattacharjee as Kajri (2021)
 Karan Khanna as Adhiraaj Singh Thakur: Shambhu's brother and Radhe's cousin (2021-2022)                      
 Shahbaz Khan as Gagan Mishra: Aryan's father and Gouri and Krishna's grandfather (2022–present)
 Rashmi Gupta as Radha Radhe Singh Thakur: Radhe's wife (2021)
 Urvashi Girish Pardeshi as Jheleum : Aryan's former fiancé and obsessive lover (2022) 
 Vijay Badlani as Mr. Mishra, Aryan's paternal uncle (2022–present)
 Achal Tankwal as Radhe Singh Thakur: Shambhu and Adhiraj's cousin and Radha's husband and Boondi's ex-husband (2021–present)
 Pratiksha Rai as Kajol: Aryan's ex-fiance and Gouri's caretaker, Mahua's Rival (2022)               
 Aditi Mishra as Krishna Aryan Mishra: Mahua and Aryan's daughter and Gouri's sister (2022–present)                
 Puvika Gupta as Gouri Aryan Mishra: Mahua and Aryan's daughter, Krishna's sister (2022–present)
 Rahul Ram Manchanda as Kishore: Mahua's ex-fiance (2022)
 Ankita Khare as Garima: Aryan's obsessive lover, ex-fiance, Gouri's caretaker, Mahua's Rival (2022-2023)
 Aayesha Vindhara (2022)
 Khushboo Sawan as Phoolia (2022)
 Urmila Sharma (2022)
 Hridayansh Shekhawat as Gagan Mishra's grandson (2022)
 Urvashi Upadhyay
 Bhavana Hada as Zara
 Shravani Goswami

Cameo Appearances 
 Shruti Anand as Ruchita Nihar Goyal from Mann Sundar (2022)

References

External links
 
 
 Nath – Zewar Ya Zanjeer on Dangal Play 

2022 Indian television series debuts
Indian drama television series
Hindi-language television shows
Television shows set in Bihar
Dangal TV original programming